Jean Patrick Reis (born 25 June 1992), commonly known as Jean Patrick, is a Brazilian footballer who plays as a defensive midfielder or right back for CRB.

Career
In January 2017, Jean Patrick joined J1 League club Albirex Niigata from Brazilian Série B club Luverdense, after they lost their midfield linchpin Léo Silva.

References

External links

1992 births
Living people
Brazilian footballers
Campeonato Brasileiro Série A players
Campeonato Brasileiro Série B players
J1 League players
Mixto Esporte Clube players
Esporte Clube Rio Verde players
Luverdense Esporte Clube players
Rio Claro Futebol Clube players
CR Vasco da Gama players
Associação Atlética Ponte Preta players
Fortaleza Esporte Clube players
Sport Club do Recife players
Clube de Regatas Brasil players
Albirex Niigata players
Brazilian expatriate footballers
Expatriate footballers in Japan
Association football midfielders
Association football fullbacks